The Essential Daffy Duck is a DVD set featuring cartoons focusing on Daffy Duck. It was released on November 1, 2011.

Contents
The contents are split over two discs. The first disc features 15 classic Daffy Duck shorts (14 of which were previously released on the Looney Tunes Golden Collection sets or Frustrated Fowl plus his debut cartoon, Porky's Duck Hunt, which makes its DVD debut). The second disc features more recent shorts and TV appearances.

Disc 1

(*): Cartoon's opening music glitches at the beginning (the first second of the music is cut off).

Disc 2

Special features
 All-New Career Profile - Daffy Duck: Ridicule Is the Burden of Genius
 2 Vintage TV Programs:
 Daffy Duck's Easter Special
 Daffy Duck's Thanks-for-Giving Special (sped-up PAL master)

References

Looney Tunes home video releases
2010s English-language films
2010s American films